Sandra Elizabeth "Sandy" Welch (born 6 December 1953 in Chester, Cheshire) is a British television writer and screenwriter.

Career
As a screenwriter, Welch has developed many serials for the BBC, including The Magnificent 7, adaptations of Charles Dickens' novel Our Mutual Friend and Elizabeth Gaskell's North and South, and most recently the well-received 2006 interpretation of Charlotte Brontë's Jane Eyre. In 2009 Welch adapted Emma by Jane Austen and The Turn of the Screw for the BBC.

Welch won a BAFTA in 1999 for "Best Drama Serial" Our Mutual Friend, the award was shared with Catherine Wearing and Julian Farino.  She was also nominated for the Edgar Award for "Best Television Feature or Miniseries" A Dark Adapted Eye in 1996 and nominated for an Emmy Award for "Outstanding Writing for a Miniseries, Movie or a Dramatic Special" Jane Eyre in 2007.

Personal life
Welch is a graduate of the National Film and Television School.

Welch married television dramatist Stephen Poliakoff. The couple have two children.

References

External links

1953 births
British television writers
British women screenwriters
Living people
People from Chester
Poliakoff family
British women television writers
20th-century British writers
21st-century British writers
Writers from Cheshire